MAP kinase-interacting serine/threonine-protein kinase 1 is an enzyme that in humans is encoded by the MKNK1 gene.

Interactions
MKNK1 has been shown to interact with MAPK1 and Eukaryotic translation initiation factor 4 gamma.

References

Further reading

EC 2.7.11